Tim or TIM may refer to:

Human names
Timothy (given name)
Tim (given name)
Timmy
Timo
Timotheus
Timotej

Place names
Tim, Denmark

Arts and entertainment

Fictional characters
 a list of characters named Tim
Tim, a character from the film Robots
Tim the Enchanter, a character from Monty Python and the Holy Grail
Tim the Bear, a character from The Cleveland Show
Tim the Beaver, the mascot of the Massachusetts Institute of Technology
TIM, a computer from The Tomorrow People
Tim, a character from The Magic School Bus
Tim, the title character from the adult animated sitcom The Life & Times of Tim
Mountain Tim, a supporting character in Steel Ball Run, a story arc of the Japanese manga series Jojo's Bizarre Adventure

Other uses in arts and entertainment
Tim (Avicii album), a 2019 album by Avicii
Tim (The Replacements album), a 1985 album by The Replacements
Tim (film), an 1979 Australian film
Tim (novel), a 1974 novel by Colleen McCullough
TIM (Owarai), a Japanese comedy unit
Treasure Island Media (TIM), a gay pornographic studio
The Incredible Machine (series), a video game series

Science and technology

Biology and chemistry
HAVCR1 (Hepatitis A virus cellular receptor 1), also known as T-cell immunoglobulin and mucin-domain 1 (TIM-1)
HAVCR2 (Hepatitis A virus cellular receptor 2), also known as T-cell immunoglobulin and mucin-domain containing-3 (TIM-3)
Triosephosphate isomerase
TIM (psychedelics) (thioisomescaline), a series of psychedelic drugs
Translocase of the inner membrane, a complex of proteins found in the inner mitochondrial membrane of the mitochondria
Timeless (gene), a gene involved in the fly circadian clock
TIM barrel, a protein fold structure
 Transmembrane immunoglobulin and munin domain, a family of immunomodulatory proteins

Other uses in science and technology
Televisión Independiente de México, a Mexican national television network
Thermal interface material, any material inserted between two parts to enhance the thermal coupling between
Gruppo TIM, an Italian telecommunications company
TIM Brasil, a Brazilian telecommunications subsidiary owned by TIM Group
TIM San Marino, a San Marino telecommunications subsidiary owned by TIM Group
IBM Tivoli Identity Manager, an identity-management system product
TNO intestinal model, model systems mimicking the digestive tract

Other uses
TIM (Bulgaria), an organized crime syndicate incorporated as a holding company 
Tim (inhabited locality), several inhabited localities in Russia
Tim (Oldenburg Baby), an aborted child that survived
Tiako I Madagasikara, a Malagasy political party
TIM, a nickname for the UK speaking clock telephone service

See also
Timothy (disambiguation)